John Morris Reeves (1 July 1909 – 1 May 1978) was a British writer principally known for his poetry, plays and contributions to children's literature and the literature of collected traditional songs. His published books include poetry, stories and anthologies for both adults and children. He was also well known as a literary critic and a broadcaster.

Biography
Born in Wealdstone   in the London Borough of Harrow, James Reeves attended Stowe School, where he won a scholarship to Jesus College, Cambridge. From 1932 to 1952 he taught English in a number of schools and teachers' training colleges, subsequently becoming a freelance author and editor.

His first collection of poems, The Natural Need, was published in 1936 by the Seizin Press, run by Robert Graves and Laura Riding, whose work Reeves's early poetry sometimes resembles. Numerous further volumes by Reeves include The Imprisoned Sea (1949), The Talking Skull (1958),The Statue, and Poems and Paraphrases (1972). Collected Poems of 1974 is the fullest edition of his verses. His best work characteristically combines intensity of mood with an understated manner to distinctive and sometimes haunting lyrical effect. The rural descriptiveness of his less distinguished poetry is elsewhere the vehicle for an ironic pastoralism voicing his disaffection with urban modernity. His popular books of poetry for children were collected as The Wandering Moon and Other Poems (1973). As an editor, Reeves was prolific, producing many anthologies of prose and poetry, as well as selections from the work of John Donne, Gerard Manley Hopkins, John Clare, and others, including “Selected Poems of Emily Dickinson” (1959). In this latter book reprinted several times, he chose to deliberately add conventional punctuation to the poems, doing away with her characteristic dashes. He thus joined her contemporary literary critic, Higginson, in not completely realising her unique style.

Bibliography 
 "The Merry-Go-Round": A Collection of Rhymes and Poems for Children (Heinemann, 1955)
 Pigeons and Princesses (Heinemann, 1956)
 Prefabulous Animiles, illustrated by Edward Ardizzone (Heinemann, 1957)
 Exploits of Don Quixote (Blackie, 1959)
 The Everlasting Circle: English traditional verse (Heinemann, 1960), folk songs collected by Cecil Sharp
 Georgian Verse (1962), editor
 The Questioning Tiger (1964), poems
 Selected Poems (Allison & Busby, 1967)
 The Cold Flame (1967), children's novel based on a Grimm fairy tale
 Understanding Poetry (1967)
 The Christmas Book, with Raymond Briggs (1968)
 Sayings of Dr. Johnson (John Baker, 1968)
 Commitment to Poetry (1969)
 Inside Poetry, with Martin Seymour-Smith (1970)
 Maildun the Voyager (1971)
 Poems and Paraphrases (1972)
 Complete Poems for Children, illustrated by Edward Ardizzone (Faber, 1973)
 A Vein of Mockery: Twentieth-century Verse (1973)
 The Forbidden Forest (William Heinemann, 1973)
 Collected Poems 1929–1974 (1974)
 More Prefabulous Animiles (1975), poems, with illustrations by Edward Ardizzone
 The Reputation and Writings of Alexander Pope (1976)
 The Closed Door (The Gruffyground Press, 1977), poems
 Arcadian Ballads (Whittington Press, 1978), poems
 The Sea
 Explores
 Underground
 The Wife And The Ghost
 Sky, Sea, Shore

References

External links

 James Reeves in the Oxford Dictionary of National Biography
 

1909 births
1978 deaths
Alumni of Jesus College, Cambridge
People educated at Stowe School
Place of death missing
20th-century English poets
English male poets
20th-century English male writers